Following Hurricane Katrina, Lagarde was appointed co-chair of the Bring New Orleans Back Commission in 2005.

References

External links
Profile from Bring Back New Orleans Commission

Living people
Year of birth missing (living people)
HCA Healthcare people
Businesspeople from New Orleans